Quinton Norman Jacobs (born 21 January 1979) is a Namibian former footballer who played as a midfielder.

Career 
Born in Windhoek, Namibia, Jacobs began his football career with local club Black Africa, playing for them from 1997 to 1999. In late 1998, he spent a trial period with Manchester United, playing in a friendly for the club's reserve team against a Major League Soccer Under-21s side.

After leaving Black Africa in 1999, he had a brief spell with Partick Thistle in the Scottish Division Two, after turning down offers from Ajax and Werder Bremen. He once scored directly from a corner kick in a match against Ross County at Firhill stadium.

He left Partick in 2000 and spent a year with German side Duisburg, but did not make a single appearance before joining South African side Black Leopards in 2001. In 2003, he moved back to Namibia to play for Civics Windhoek. He spent a year there and another year with Ramblers before returning to South Africa to play for Ajax Cape Town in 2005. In 2006, Jacobs got another chance in European football, joining Norway's Bryne, but after just one goal in 15 appearances, he rejoined Ramblers.

In 2009, he placed for African Stars F.C. in Namibia and joined Palestinian club Jabal Al Mukaber early in 2010.

United Sikkim
He played for the United Sikkim F.C. in the 2012 I-League 2nd Division. On 15 March 2012 he scored a brace which helped his side win 3–2 against Kalighat Milan Sangha F.C. in Siliguri.
He had scored 16 goals in 23 matches in the 2nd Division for the Gangtok-based club helping his side win promotion to the 2012-13 I-League.

Salgaocar
On 6 May 2012 Jacobs signed with former Indian I-League champions Salgaocar.

Mohun Bagan
In January 2013, the century-old Kolkata-based club Mohun Bagan A.C. signed this Namibian midfielder as a replacement to the underperforming Stanley Okoroigwe. On 28th Match, he scored his first I-League goal for the club against Pailan Arrows in a 2–0 win at Kalyani. He also won the Man of the Match for the effort.

International career 
He is a member of the Namibia national football team.

References

External links
 

1979 births
Living people
Cape Town Spurs F.C. players
Bryne FK players
Expatriate footballers in Scotland
Black Africa S.C. players
F.C. Civics Windhoek players
Association football midfielders
Namibia international footballers
2008 Africa Cup of Nations players
Namibian expatriate footballers
Namibian expatriate sportspeople in Germany
Namibian expatriate sportspeople in Norway
Namibian expatriate sportspeople in South Africa
Namibian expatriate sportspeople in the United Kingdom
Namibian expatriate sportspeople in the State of Palestine
Namibian expatriate sportspeople in India
Black Leopards F.C. players
African Stars F.C. players
Partick Thistle F.C. players
Footballers from Windhoek
Expatriate soccer players in South Africa
Ramblers F.C. players
Expatriate footballers in the State of Palestine
United Sikkim F.C. players
Scottish Football League players
Mohun Bagan AC players
I-League players
Expatriate footballers in India
Salgaocar FC players
MSV Duisburg players
Calcutta Football League players
Namibian men's footballers